The Islamic Front for the Liberation of Bahrain was a Shi'a Islamist militant group that advocated theocratic rule in Bahrain from 1981 to the 1990s. It was based in Iran and trained and financed by Iranian intelligence and Revolutionary Guards.

Aims and activities

The professed aim of the Front was the ‘uprising of all Muslims under Imam Khomeini’. It came to international prominence as the front organisation for the 1981 failed coup in Bahrain, which attempted to install Iraqi Ayatollah Hadi al-Modarresi as the spiritual leader of a theocratic state.  Al-Modarresi in addition to heading the IFLB served as Khomeini’s “personal representative” in Bahrain.
 
According to Daniel Byman of Georgetown University, Iran's backing of the Front was part of a strategy to support radical Islamist groups throughout the region:
 

 
The Front served as an Iranian proxy in the 1980s. It is also referred to as a 'virtual organization' of Iranian intelligence. In Low Intensity Conflict in the Third World by Stephen Blank et al., it is argued that the Front's attempted coup d’etat in 1981 cannot be understood without reference to Iran’s geo-strategic objectives in its war with Saddam Hussein’s Iraq:

1990s Bombings
The 1981 coup was not a success and following the failure to spur revolution, the Front became associated with bomb attacks, often against ‘soft’ civilian targets. On 1 November 1996, the Front claimed responsibility for the bombing of the Diplomat Hotel, with the group telling the Associated Press "We put a bomb in the Diplomat hotel 20 minutes ago...after the feast...tell the government that we will destroy everyplace." In the 1990s uprising in Bahrain the Front only played a marginal role, as its relationship with Iran, the perception that it represented the “Shirazi faction” (i.e. followers of Grand Ayatollah Mohammad Shirazi) and its strategy of bombings all served to undermine its support among the wider community.

Dissolution
The IFLB was disbanded in 2002 in response to King Hamad's reforms. Its members were amnestied from prison and exile and most returned to Bahrain to work within the political process in 2001, and were active in the Islamic Action Party and the Bahrain Centre for Human Rights. The Bahran Centre for Human Rights was banned in 2004, and the Islamic Action Party was banned in 2011, when it supported  the 2011 Bahraini uprising.

References

External links
IFLB website (outdated)

Politics of Bahrain
Shia Islamist groups
Bahrain, Islamic Front for the Liberation of